Play party can mean:

 Play party (U.S. traditional), a type of traditional U.S. social event where people get together to sing and dance
 Play party (BDSM), a BDSM or kink social event in which BDSM and/or kinky activities take place

See also 
 Party and play
 Party game